The Enoploteuthidea are a family of  squid comprising approximately 40 species in four genera. Most species have a mantle length ranging from 3–13 cm. Hooks are present on all arms and tentacles. The family is best known for the large array of photophores throughout the body.

Species 
Genus Abralia
Abralia andamanica
Abralia armata
Abralia astrolineata
Abralia astrosticta
Abralia dubia
Abralia fasciolata
Abralia grimpei
Abralia heminuchalis
Abralia marisarabica
Abralia multihamata
Abralia omiae
Abralia redfieldi
Abralia renschi
Abralia robsoni
Abralia siedleckyi
Abralia similis
Abralia spaercki
Abralia steindachneri
Abralia trigonura
Abralia veranyi, eye-flash squid or Verany's enope squid
Genus Abraliopsis
Abraliopsis affinis
Abraliopsis atlantica
Abraliopsis chuni
Abraliopsis falco
Abraliopsis felis
Abraliopsis gilchristi
Abraliopsis hoylei
Abraliopsis lineata
?Abraliopsis morisii *
Abraliopsis pacificus
Abraliopsis pfefferi, Pfeffer's enope squid
Abraliopsis tui
Genus Enoploteuthis
Enoploteuthis anapsis
Enoploteuthis chunii
Enoploteuthis galaxias
Enoploteuthis higginsi
Enoploteuthis jonesi
Enoploteuthis leptura
Enoploteuthis magnoceani
Enoploteuthis obliqua
Enoploteuthis octolineata
Enoploteuthis reticulata
Enoploteuthis semilineata
Genus Watasenia
Watasenia scintillans, sparkling enope squid or firefly squid

The species listed above with an asterisk (*) is questionable and needs further study to determine if it is a valid species or a synonym. The question mark (?) indicates questionable placement within the genus.

References

External links  

 Tree of Life web project: Enoploteuthidae
 Enoploteuthidae discussion forum at TONMO.com

Squid
Cephalopod families